Sushil Kumar Dhara (2 March 1911 – 28 January 2011) was a revolutionary in British India and a political leader after Indian Independence in 1947.

Dhara was born on 2 March 1911 in Tikarampur (near Tamluk) in Mahisadal in the present Purba Medinipur district  into a Hindu family. He was involved in political activities from his school days. He completed his education from Vidyasagar College in 1937. Later, in 1940, he participated in the Satyagraha movement of Gandhi. In August 1942 he played the lead role in launching an anti-British movement in undivided Midnapore. The movement helped to free Tamralipta from British rule and a free government was formed in this region on 17 December 1942. Vidyut Bahini, of the parallel Government of Tamluk was also commanded by him. As a member of Tamralipta Jatiya Sarkar, which is better known as Tamralipta National Government, formed during the 1942 August Movement, Dhara held the portfolios of War and Home. During the period of British governance, Dhara spent 12 years and 4 months in prison.

After independence of India, Dhara won several elections, which included the Mahishadal seat of West Bengal Assembly in 1962, 1967 and 1969. In 1962, he was the winner of the Assembly poll as a Congress candidate. He also created the Bangla Congress in 1966. In 1967, Prafulla Sen was defeated at Arambagh by another Gandhian Ajoy Mukherjee, who became chief minister of West Bengal after Prafulla Chandra Sen. Architect of Ajoy Mukherjee's victory at Arambagh was Narayan Ch Ghosh the then student's leader there. Dhara had inspired students of Arambagh unfolding his image as commander of Vidyut Bahini. In 1967, he had won the poll as a candidate of Bangla Congress. He also served the state government as Industry and Commerce Minister. He had published a book titled Ken ei banya written by Narayan Ch Ghosh for circulation in the lower Damudar basin. Reading noted book people there were very much agitated and took effective role against Congress. Later, Ajoy Mukherjee with some of his closest colleagues, such as Pranob Mukherjee, joined Indian National Congress leaving Dhara - his long term associates. Ajoy Mukherjee had pushed Pranab Mukherjee to be State Minister in the Indian Cabinet. In 1977, from the Tamluk constituency, Dhara was elected to the Lok Sabha as a candidate of the Janata Party.

Dhara stepped back from politics in the 1980s and involved himself in social work. He died on 28 January 2011, at the age of 100, owing to prolonged sickness.

References

External links
  https://archive.today/20130218104518/http://www.smritisoudha.in/

People from Purba Medinipur district
India MPs 1977–1979
1911 births
2011 deaths
Lok Sabha members from West Bengal
Janata Party politicians
Bangla Congress politicians
Indian independence activists from West Bengal
West Bengal politicians
Bengali Hindus
20th-century Bengalis